Otorhinolaryngology (abbreviated ORL and also known as otolaryngology, otolaryngology–head and neck surgery (ORL–H&N or OHNS), or ear, nose, and throat (ENT)) is a surgical subspeciality within medicine that deals with the surgical and medical management of conditions of the head and neck. Doctors who specialize in this area are called otorhinolaryngologists, otolaryngologists, head and neck surgeons, or ENT surgeons or physicians. Patients seek treatment from an otorhinolaryngologist for diseases of the ear, nose, throat, base of the skull, head, and neck. These commonly include functional diseases that affect the senses and activities of eating, drinking, speaking, breathing, swallowing, and hearing. In addition, ENT surgery encompasses the surgical management of cancers and benign tumors and reconstruction of the head and neck as well as plastic surgery of the face and neck.

Etymology
The term is a combination of New Latin combining forms (oto- + rhino- + laryngo- + -logy) derived from four Ancient Greek words: οὖς ous (gen.: ὠτός otos), "ear", ῥίς rhis, "nose", λάρυγξ larynx, "larynx" and -λογία logia, "study" (cf. Greek ωτορινολαρυγγολόγος, "otorhinolaryngologist").

Training
Otorhinolaryngologists are physicians (MD, DO, MBBS, MBChB, etc.) who complete both medical school and an average of 5–7 years of post-graduate surgical training in ORL-H&N. In the United States, trainees complete at least five years of surgical residency training. This comprises three to six months of general surgical training and four and a half years in ORL-H&N specialist surgery.  In Canada and the United States, practitioners complete a five-year residency training after medical school.

Following residency training, some otolaryngologist-head & neck surgeons complete an advanced sub-specialty fellowship, where training can be one to two years in duration. Fellowships include head and neck surgical oncology, facial plastic surgery, rhinology and sinus surgery, neuro-otology, pediatric otolaryngology, and laryngology. In the United States and Canada, otorhinolaryngology is one of the most competitive specialties in medicine in which to obtain a residency position following medical school.

In the United Kingdom entrance to otorhinolaryngology higher surgical training is highly competitive and involves a rigorous national selection process. The training programme consists of 6 years of higher surgical training after which trainees frequently undertake fellowships in a sub-speciality prior to becoming a consultant.

The typical total length of education and training, post-secondary school is 12–14 years. Otolaryngology is among the more highly compensated surgical specialties in the United States. In 2019, the average annual income was $461,000.

Sub-specialties

(* Currently recognized by American Board of Medical Subspecialties)

Topics by subspecialty

Head and neck surgery

 Head and neck surgical oncology (field of surgery treating cancer/malignancy of the head and neck)
 Head and neck mucosal malignancy (cancer of the pink lining of the upper aerodigestive tract)
Oral cancer (cancer of lips, gums, tongue, hard palate, cheek, floor of mouth)
Oropharyngeal cancer (cancer of oropharynx, soft palate, tonsil, base of tongue)
Larynx cancer (voice box cancer)
Hypopharynx cancer (lower throat cancer)
Sinonasal cancer
Nasopharyngeal cancer
Skin cancer of the head & neck
Thyroid cancer
Salivary gland cancer
Head and neck sarcoma
 Endocrine surgery of the head and neck
Thyroid surgery
Parathyroid surgery
Microvascular free flap reconstructive surgery
Skull base surgery

Otology and neurotology

Study of diseases of the outer ear, middle ear and mastoid, and inner ear, and surrounding structures (such as the facial nerve and lateral skull base)

 Outer ear diseases
Otitis externa –
outer ear or ear canal inflammation
Middle ear and mastoid diseases
Otitis media – middle ear inflammation
Perforated eardrum (hole in the eardrum due to infection, trauma, explosion or loud noise)
Mastoiditis
Inner ear diseases
BPPV – benign paroxysmal positional vertigo
Labyrinthitis/Vestibular neuronitis
Ménière's disease/Endolymphatic hydrops
Perilymphatic fistula
Acoustic neuroma, vestibular schwannoma
Facial nerve disease
Idiopathic facial palsy (Bell's Palsy)
Facial nerve tumors
Ramsay Hunt Syndrome
 Symptoms
Hearing loss
Tinnitus (subjective noise in the ear)
Aural fullness (sense of fullness in the ear)
Otalgia (pain referring to the ear)
Otorrhea (fluid draining from the ear)
Vertigo
Imbalance

Rhinology
Rhinology includes nasal dysfunction and sinus diseases.

Nasal obstruction
Nasal septum deviation
Sinusitis – acute, chronic
 Environmental allergies
Rhinitis
Pituitary tumor
Empty nose syndrome
 Severe or recurrent epistaxis

Pediatric otorhinolaryngology

Adenoidectomy
Caustic ingestion
 Cricotracheal resection
Decannulation
Laryngomalacia
Laryngotracheal reconstruction
Myringotomy and tubes
Obstructive sleep apnea – pediatric
Tonsillectomy

Laryngology

Dysphonia/hoarseness
Laryngitis
Reinke's edema
Vocal cord nodules and polyps
Spasmodic dysphonia
Tracheostomy
Cancer of the larynx
Vocology – science and practice of voice habilitation

Facial plastic and reconstructive surgery
Facial plastic and reconstructive surgery is a one-year fellowship open to otorhinolaryngologists who wish to begin learning the aesthetic and reconstructive surgical principles of the head, face, and neck pioneered by the specialty of Plastic and Reconstructive Surgery.

Rhinoplasty and septoplasty
Facelift (rhytidectomy)
Browlift
Blepharoplasty
Otoplasty
Genioplasty
 Injectable cosmetic treatments
Trauma to the face
Nasal bone fracture
Mandible fracture
Orbital fracture
 Frontal sinus fracture
 Complex lacerations and soft tissue damage
 Skin cancer (e.g. Basal Cell Carcinoma)

Microvascular reconstruction repair 
Microvascular reconstruction repair is a common operation that is done on patients who see an Otorhinolaryngologist. Microvascular reconstruction repair is a surgical procedure that involves moving a composite piece of tissue from the patient's body and moves it to the head and or neck. Microvascular head and neck reconstruction is used to treat head and neck cancers, including those of the larynx and pharynx, oral cavity, salivary glands, jaws, calvarium, sinuses, tongue and skin. The tissue that is most commonly moved during this procedure is from the arms, legs, back, and can come from the skin, bone, fat, and or muscle. When doing this procedure, the decision on which is moved is determined on the reconstructive needs. Transfer of the tissue to the head and neck allows surgeons to rebuild the patient's jaw, optimize tongue function, and reconstruct the throat. When the pieces of tissue are moved, they require their own blood supply for a chance of survival in their new location. After the surgery is completed, the blood vessels that feed the tissue transplant are reconnected to new blood vessels in the neck. These blood vessels are typically no more than 1 to 3 millimeters in diameter which means these connections need to be made with a microscope which is why this procedure is called "microvascular surgery."

See also

 Plastic and Reconstructive Surgery
 Audiology
 Head and neck anatomy
 Head and neck cancer
 Head mirror
 Oral and maxillofacial surgery
 Surgeon
 Speech–language pathology

References

 
Surgical specialties